The National Institute of Rural Development and Panchayati Raj (NIRD&PR), an autonomous organisation under the Union Ministry of Rural Development, is a premier national centre of excellence in rural development and Panchayati Raj. Recognized internationally as one of the UN-ESCAP Centres of Excellence, it builds capacities of rural development functionaries, elected representatives of PRIs, bankers, NGOs and other stakeholders through inter-related activities of training, research and consultancy. The Institute is located in Hyderabad, Telangana. The NIRD&PR celebrated its Golden Jubilee Year of establishment in 2008. In addition to the main campus at Hyderabad, this Institute has North-Eastern Regional Centre at Guwahati, Assam to meet the NE-regional needs.

Overview

Vision 
The vision of NIRD&PR is to focus on the policies and programmes that benefit the rural poor, strive to energise the democratic decentralization processes, improve the operation and efficiency of rural development personnel, promote transfer of technology through its social laboratories, Technology Park and create environmental awareness. As a “think-tank” for the Ministry of Rural Development, NIRD while acting as a repository of knowledge on rural development would assist the Ministry in policy formulation and choice of options in rural development to usher in the changes.

Mission 
To examine and analyse the factors contributing to the improvement of economic and social well-being of people in rural areas on a sustainable basis with focus on the rural poor and the other disadvantaged groups through research, action research, consultancy and documentation efforts.

To facilitate the rural development efforts with particular emphasis and focus on the rural poor by improving the knowledge, skills and attitudes of rural development officials and non-officials through organising training, workshops and Seminars.

Objectives 

The NIRD&PR is mandated to:

 Organise training programmes, conferences, seminars and workshops for senior level development managers, elected representatives, bankers, NGOs and other stakeholders;
 Undertake, aid, promote and coordinate research on its own and / or collaborate with State, national and international development agencies;
 Analyse and offer solutions to problems encountered in planning and implementation of the programmes for rural development, decentralised governance, panchayati raj and related programmes;
 Study the functioning of the Panchayati Raj Institutions (PRIs) and rural development programmes across the States;
 Analyse and propose solutions to problems in planning and implementation of the programmes for rural development; and
 Develop content and disseminate information and transfer technology through periodicals, reports, e-modules and other publications.

History
In the early fifties, Community Development Blocks were set up in the country to promote social and economic development of villages. The Central Institute of Study and Research in Community Development was conceived and set up in 1958 at Mussoorie for offering orientation courses to officers of executive hierarchy in the development programmes. The Trainers' Training Institute (subsequently renamed as the Institute for Instruction in Community Development), established in December, 1958 at Rajpur, Dehradun was entrusted with the task of training of District Panchayat Officers and sub-divisional officers and trainers of state institutions. In April 1962, both the Institutes were merged into one named as National Institute of Community Development (NICD). NICD was shifted to Hyderabad campus during 1964-65. The Institute was changed in to registered society under the Public Services Registration Act No.1 of 1350 Fasli (No.229 of 1965). As per decision taken by General Council in its meeting held on 20.9.1977, the Institute was renamed and registered as National Institute of Rural Development (NIRD). Recognizing the need for more focus on strengthening Panchayati Raj system and capacity building of PRI functionaries through the network of SIRDs and ETCs, the name of NIRD has been changed as National Institute of Rural Development & Panchayati Raj (NIRD&PR) in the year 2014.

NIRDPR - NERC 
The North Eastern Regional Centre of the National Institute of Rural Development & Panchayati Raj (NIRD & PR-NERC) came into existence in July 1983 at Guwahati with the aim to orient its training and research activities to the specific needs and potentials of North Eastern States. The Centre is located at Jawaharnagar, Khanapara, adjacent to Assam Administrative Staff College and Veterinary College, Assam Agriculture University, Khanapara. It is at a distance of about 15 km from Guwahati Railway Station and Central ASTC Bus Stand and nearly 35 km from Lokpriya Gopinath Bordoloi International Airport.

Controversies

Sexual harassment allegations
There have been allegations of rampant sexual harassment of women inside NIRDPR campus. In 2018 Satyaranjan Mahakul, an Assistant Professor of NIRD was arrested by Cyberabad Police on charges of molesting an Indonesian student. In 2015 NIRDPR Associate Professor Dr V Suresh Babu had been penalised for sexually abusing Assistant Professor Dr G. Valentina. However CAT deemed the penalty as unjust.

Hemangi Sharma, a woman officer of NIRDPR, alleged that the renowned poet and writer Dr Tapan Kumar Pradhan had sexually harassed her when he had visited NIRD as a guest speaker in 2015. But Dr Pradhan in his book claims that he had a consensual relationship with Hemangi Sharma. There is also no evidence of NIRDPR having invited Dr Pradhan for any guest lecture.

Corruption allegations
There have been several allegations of corruption by NIRDPR officials, including by faculty members and class-IV staff The activist Dr Tapan Kumar Pradhan has also alleged serious irregularities in NIRDPR campus in his letters to DG, NIRD and petitions to CIC.

References

External links
Official website

Rural development organisations in India
Research institutes in Hyderabad, India
Panchayati raj (India)
Research institutes established in 1958
1958 establishments in Andhra Pradesh